The following is a list of films originally produced and/or distributed theatrically by Metro-Goldwyn-Mayer and released between 2010 and 2019.

See also 
 Lists of Metro-Goldwyn-Mayer films

References 

2010-2019
American films by studio
2010s in American cinema
Lists of 2010s films